John Graham (1774 – August 6, 1820) was an American politician and diplomat. He was born in Dumfries, Virginia, and graduated from Columbia University in 1790. He moved to Kentucky and served in the Kentucky legislature.

From 1801 to 1803 he served as secretary and chargé d'affaires in the U.S. legation to Spain. 

Graham was chief clerk of the State Department from 1807 to 1817 and as such was acting United States Secretary of State for five days, from March 4 to March 9, 1817, at the start of the administration of President James Monroe. Along with Caesar Augustus Rodney and Theodorick Bland, Graham was selected by Monroe in 1817 as one of three commissioners for a special diplomatic mission to South America, the South American Commission of 1817-1818. He served as the U.S. Minister to Portugal at Rio de Janeiro from June 24, 1819, to June 13, 1820.

He died in Washington, D.C., on August 6, 1820. His brother, George Graham, was acting Secretary of War under Presidents Madison and Monroe.

References
General
National Cyclopaedia of American Biography (1901), Vol. XI, p. 317.
Peterson, Harold F., Argentina and the United States, 1810-1960 (1964), p. 38 ff.
Beers, Henry Putney, French and Spanish Records of Louisiana (1989), p. 22.
Specific

People from Dumfries, Virginia
Columbia College (New York) alumni
1774 births
1820 deaths
Date of birth missing
19th-century American diplomats
Ambassadors of the United States to Portugal
Chief Clerks of the United States Department of State
Acting United States Secretaries of State